Tommy Storm and the Galactic Knights is the second novel in the Tommy Storm series, written by Irish author A.J. Healy. Set three years after the first Tommy Storm,  Tommy and his friends travel across the universe searching for answers about the TFC. They must escape the evil Nack Jickilson, and seek help from the Beast of Hellsbells. Unbeknownst to them, A-Sad-Bin-Liner is planning to destroy thousands of planets, including Earth.

Tommy Storm and the Galactic Knights, abbreviated TS2, was published in Ireland on 24 September 2009, by UK publisher, Quercus. The author is currently waiting for a payment in advance, before he can start Tommy Storm 3 (TS3)

Tommy Storm 3

A.J. Healy has announced on his website that he is waiting for his publisher, Quercus, to pay an advance before he starts Tommy Storm 3 (TS3). No plot or release hits have been made, however you can e-mail Healy to be added to a distribution list to be e-mailed when a release date is known.

External links
The Tommy Storm website

2009 Irish novels
2009 children's books
Irish children's novels
Children's science fiction novels
Sequel novels
Quercus (publisher) books